Nazifa Tushi (Bengali: নাজিফা তুষি) is a Bangladeshi actress, model and TV presenter. She was the first runner-up 2014 in the Lux Channel I Superstar beauty pageant of Bangladesh. She is known for her roles in films like  Hawa, Networker Baire and in series like Syndicate.

She graduated from the Independent University, Bangladesh.

Career
Tushi was the first runner-up in the 2014 Lux Channel I Superstar beauty pageant. She then starred in the 2016 romantic drama film Ice Cream, directed by Redoan Rony. The film also features Sariful Razz and Kumar Uday.

In the twelve months after the release of Ice Cream, she made a television commercial in which she rode on the back of a scooter in Dhaka's Kuril Flyover area, and modeled in a music video for the rock song "Na". Not until late 2019 did she work in another film, Mejbaur Rahman Sumon's Hawa. She explained the several year break by saying she wanted to concentrate on her studies.

While awaiting the release of Hawa, she played Samia in the 2021 web film Networker Baire, again working alongside Razz. Shortly after the release of the film, she and three of her co-stars were hospitalized after an early hours road traffic accident in Dhaka. She later traveled India for related surgery.

She has also appeared in the web series Syndicate. She has worked in the film is Hawa.

Filmography

See also
 Mumtaheena Toya
 Anika Kabir Shokh
 Tanjin Tisha
 Pori Moni
 Sabila Nur

References

Living people
Year of birth missing (living people)
Place of birth missing (living people)
Bangladeshi actresses
Bangladeshi female models